Yevhen Kostyantynovych Chepurnenko (born 6 September 1989) is a Ukrainian professional footballer who plays as a midfielder.

Career

Desna Chernihiv
In 2015, he returned to FC Desna Chernihiv, the main team of Chernihiv, where he stayed until 2017.

Dnepr Mogilev
In 2018, he moved to Belarusian side Dnepr Mogilev.

Shevardeni-1906 Tbilisi
In 2019, he joined Georgian club Shevardeni-1906 Tbilisi.

Dinaz Vyshhorod
In 2020, he signed for Dinaz Vyshhorod in Ukrainian Second League. He was voted the Best Player of the round 4 of the 2020–21 season. In January 2021, he extended his contract.

Return to Desna
On 19 February 2021, he rejoined Desna Chernihiv in Ukrainian Premier League. He made his league debut against Dynamo Kyiv at the Valeriy Lobanovskyi Dynamo Stadium, replacing Pylyp Budkivskyi. On 8 March 2021, he scored his first goal of the 2020–21 league season in a 0–4 away win Rukh Lviv at the Skif Stadium. In the summer of 2021, his contract with the club expired.

Return to Dinaz
On 5 July 2021, he returned to Dinaz Vyshhorod in Ukrainian Second League, signing a one-year contract. On 31 July, he scored against Dnipro Cherkasy. He was elected Best Player of the round 5 of the 2021–22 season. On 4 September, he scored two goals against Bukovyna. On 29 October, he scored twice against Rubikon Kyiv.

Zhetysu
In May 2022, he moved to Zhetysu in Kazakhstan First League. During his stay, he scored 6 goals in 10 league matches, before leaving the club on 17 July 2022.

Odra Wodzisław
On 31 July 2022, Chepurnenko signed a one-year deal with Polish III liga side Odra Wodzisław Śląski. On 7 August, he played his first match with the new club against Pniówek Pawłowice Śląskie. A week later, he scored his first goal for Odra against Goczałkowice-Zdrój. On 9 October, Odra announced they had amicably terminated their contract with Chepurenko.

Bukovyna Chernivtsi
In November 2022 he signed for Bukovyna Chernivtsi. In January 2023 he left the club by mutual consent.

Career statistics

Club

Honours
Liviv
Ukrainian First League: 2007–08

Desna Chernihiv
Ukrainian Second League: 2012–13

Oleksandriya
Ukrainian First League: 2014–15

Individual
 Desna Chernihiv Player of the Year: 2014, 2016
 Ukrainian First League Player of the Month: 2017–18, round 8
 Ukrainian Second League Player of the Week: 2020–21, round 4, 2021–22, round 5, 2021–22, round 13,

References

External links
 Yevhen Chepurnenko at FC Desna Chernihiv 
 Yevhen Chepurnenko at FC Dinaz Vyshhorod 
 
 
 
 

1989 births
Living people
People from Berdiansk
Sportspeople from Zaporizhzhia Oblast
Ukrainian footballers
Association football midfielders
FC Knyazha Shchaslyve players
FC Lviv players
FC Sevastopol players
FC Desna Chernihiv players
FC Oleksandriya players
FC Volyn Lutsk players
FC Helios Kharkiv players
FC Dnepr Mogilev players
FC Ahrobiznes Volochysk players
FC Shevardeni-1906 Tbilisi players
FC Dinaz Vyshhorod players
FC Zhetysu players
Odra Wodzisław Śląski players
FC Bukovyna Chernivtsi players
Ukrainian Premier League players
Ukrainian First League players
Ukrainian Second League players
Belarusian Premier League players
Erovnuli Liga 2 players
Kazakhstan First Division players
III liga players
Ukrainian expatriate footballers
Expatriate footballers in Belarus
Ukrainian expatriate sportspeople in Belarus
Expatriate footballers in Georgia (country)
Ukrainian expatriate sportspeople in Georgia (country)
Expatriate footballers in Kazakhstan
Ukrainian expatriate sportspeople in Kazakhstan
Expatriate footballers in Poland
Ukrainian expatriate sportspeople in Poland